Club Esportiu Ciutat i Provincia de Lleida Basquetbol is a professional basketball team based in Lleida, Catalonia, Spain and plays in the Barris Nord, in LEB Oro league. The club born in the summer of 1997 like a need of unify the basketball in Lleida, with the origin of Maristes team, that played in the Second National Division. The team spend two seasons in the EBA League linked by Bàsquet Manresa and under the name of Baró de Maials. Caprabo Lleida (the new name of the team) jump to the LEB League in 1999 and to the ACB League in 2001. Under the name of Plus Pujol Lleida, the club returns to LEB League in 2005. In 2009, is relegated to EBA League due economic problems and changed the name to Avantmèdic Lleida, but in the next year, they return to LEB Oro League via CB Cornellà.

On July 6, 2012, Lleida Basquetbol announced via Twitter the club would not join any competition for the 2012–13 season, and it would be replaced by the new creation club Força Lleida CE.

History

ULEB era

In the 2002/03 season, Caprabo Lleida started playing the ULEB Cup. The team ranked second in the group round with a record of 6-4, the same as Varese (Italy), first. In the first round, Caprabo won Ural Great (Russia) but in the second lost with Krka Novo Mesto (Slovenia). In the 2003/04 season, the team played again ULEB Cup by invitation. Caprabo ranked first in the group round with a record of 8-2. In the first round, the theam won Makedonikos (Greece) but they lost again in the second round, this time against Estudiantes (Spain).

Trophies and awards

Trophies
LEB: 
2000–01: 1
Lliga Catalana ACB: 
2002–03, 2003–04: 2
Lliga Catalana LEB: 
2007–08, 2008–09: 2

Individual awards
LEB Oro MVP
Joe Bunn – 2000
LEB Oro Best Rebounder
Dwayne Curtis – 2011

Season by season

Past rosters

1999–2000

2000–01

2001–02

2002–03

2003–04

2004–05

 2008-2009 CE Lleida Bàsquet season
 2007-2008 CE Lleida Bàsquet season

Retired numbers
10 Berni Tamames, C, 2001–07
12 Manel Bosch, F, 2001–03

Records

Career Statistical Leaders
Games - Jaume Comas (313)
Field Goals Made - AJ Bramlett (834)
Field Goals Attempted - AJ Bramlett (1,530)
3-Point Field Goals Made - Berni Álvarez (264)
3-Point Field Goals Attempted - Berni Álvarez (683)
Free Throws Made - Jaume Comas (642)
Free Throws Attempted - Jaume Comas (899)
Rebounds - AJ Bramlett (1,112)
Assists - Jaume Comas (770)
Blocked Shots - AJ Bramlett and Michael Ruffin (138)
Points - Jaume Comas (2,495)

Team Records
Most Points in a Game
 115 - versus Abeconsa Ferrol (115-66) on November 3, 2000
Fewest Points in a Game
 52 - versus Caja San Fernando (52-76) on December 1, 2001
Largest Margin of Victory in a Game
 49 - versus Abeconsa Ferrol (115-66) on November 3, 2000
Largest Margin of Defeat in a Game
 40 - versus TAU Cerámica (120-80) on May 12, 2005
Most Points in a Game by Rival
 120 - versus TAU Cerámica (120-80) on May 12, 2005
Fewest Points in a Game by Rival
 46 - versus León Caja España (67-46) on January 14, 2006
Longest Winning Streak
7 from March 9, 2002 to April 20, 2002 (defeating Adecco Estudiantes, Granada, Casademont Girona, Caja San Fernando, Leche Río Breogán, Cantabria Lobos and Cáceres).
Longest Losing Streak
7 from November 15, 2003 to January 3, 2004
7 from January 30, 2005 to March 26, 2005
7 from October 29, 2005 to December 4, 2005

Head coaches

As of May 13, 2012. Only competitive matches are counted.

Former players with NBA experience
 Derrick Alston
 AJ Bramlett
 Luis Felipe López
 Johnny Rogers
 Michael Ruffin
 Dickey Simpkins
 Kevin Thompson

Top game players
 Jaume Comas (313)
 Berni Tamames (182)
 Berni Álvarez (167)
 AJ Bramlett (160)
 Roger Grimau (149)

References

External links
Federación Española de Baloncesto
Official Lleida Bàsquet website
Lleida Bàsquet Blog

Defunct basketball teams in Spain
Catalan basketball teams
Former LEB Oro teams
Basket
Basketball teams established in 1997
Former Liga ACB teams